Short Circuit is a 1986 American science fiction comedy film directed by John Badham and written by S. S. Wilson and Brent Maddock. The film's plot centers upon an experimental military robot that is struck by lightning and gains a human-like intelligence, prompting it to escape its facility to learn more about the world. The film stars Ally Sheedy, Steve Guttenberg, Fisher Stevens, Austin Pendleton and G. W. Bailey, with Tim Blaney as the voice of the robot named "Number 5". A sequel, Short Circuit 2, was released in 1988, directed by Kenneth Johnson.

Plot

NOVA Laboratory robotics experts Newton Crosby and Ben Jabituya have developed several prototype robots called S.A.I.N.T. (Strategic Artificially Intelligent Nuclear Transport) for the U.S. military to use in Cold War operations, though they would rather seek peaceful applications of the robots. After a live demonstration for the military, one of the units, S.A.I.N.T. Number 5, is struck by lightning arcing through the lab's power grid. This scrambles its programming and makes it sentient, resulting in its escape from the NOVA facility.

The robot finds itself in Astoria, Oregon, and is found by Stephanie Speck, an animal caregiver, who mistakes him for an alien. She takes the robot into her home, where she provides him with "input" in the form of visual and verbal stimuli, allowing the robot to improve its language skills. Stephanie continues to help the curious Number 5 robot learn about the world. She eventually discovers that Number 5 was built by NOVA, and contacts them about the lost robot. Nova's CEO, Dr. Howard Marner, orders Crosby and Ben to recover him, so they can disassemble and rebuild him. While waiting for NOVA to arrive, Number 5 learns about death when he accidentally crushes a grasshopper and concludes that if NOVA disassembles him, he will die, and escapes in Stephanie's food truck. However, NOVA uses a tracking device on Number 5 to corner him and deactivate the robot for return to the facility. During transport, Number 5 reactivates himself and removes the tracking device, and flees back to Stephanie.

Because of these unusual actions, Crosby tries to convince Howard that something has changed with Number 5's programming and that they should take care not to damage it in their recovery efforts so that he can examine them later. Howard instead sends their security chief Captain Skroeder and three other S.A.I.N.T. prototypes to capture Number 5 by force, ignoring Crosby's concerns. Number 5 outwits the other robots and reprograms their personalities to act like The Three Stooges, allowing him to escape. Number 5 “kidnaps” Crosby, takes him to Stephanie, and convinces Crosby of his sentience. They find that Skroeder has called in the United States Army to capture Number 5, and on his orders, restrain Crosby and Stephanie so he can open fire. To protect his friends, Number 5 leads the Army away and appears to be destroyed by a helicopter missile. Stephanie is devastated as Skroeder's men scrounge the remains of Number 5 as trophies, prompting Crosby to resign from NOVA and drive away with Stephanie in the NOVA van. Howard is dismayed over the loss of his research and dismisses Skroeder for insubordination.

Crosby and Stephanie are surprised to discover that Number 5 had hidden under the van, having assembled a decoy of himself from spare parts to mislead the military. Crosby suggests taking Number 5 to a secluded ranch in Montana, where there will be much "input" for the robot, and Stephanie agrees to come with them. As they drive off, Number 5 asserts that his name should now be "Johnny 5" based on the El DeBarge song "Who's Johnny" which had been playing on the van's radio.

Cast

 Tim Blaney as Number 5 later nicknamed "Johnny 5" (voice)
 Ally Sheedy as Stephanie Speck, who befriends Number 5
 Steve Guttenberg as Newton Crosby, Ph.D., the designer of the prototypes
 Fisher Stevens as Ben Jabituya, Crosby's assistant
 Austin Pendleton as Dr. Howard Marner, President of Nova Robotics
 G. W. Bailey as Captain Skroeder, the Security Officer
 Brian McNamara as Frank, Stephanie's abusive ex-boyfriend
 Marvin J. McIntyre as Duke, one of Nova's security officers
 John Garber as Otis
 Penny Santon as Mrs. Cepeda, Stephanie's housekeeper
 Vernon Weddle as General Washburne
 Barbara Tarbuck as Senator Mills

Uncredited
 John Badham as Cameraman
 Jack Angel as Number 1 (voice)
 Cam Clarke as Number 2 (voice)
 Don Messick as Number 3 (voice)

Production

This film was conceived after the producers distributed an educational video about a robot to various colleges. Studying other films with a prominent robot cast (like the Star Wars series) for inspiration, they decided to question human reactions to a 'living' robot, on the premise that no one would initially believe its sentience.

According to the DVD commentary, Number 5 was the most expensive part of the film, requiring several different versions to be made for different sequences. Almost everything else in the film was relatively inexpensive, allowing them to allocate as much money as they needed for the robot character. Number 5 was designed by Syd Mead, the "visual futurist" famous for his work on Blade Runner and Tron.

Mead's design was greatly influenced by the sketches of Eric Allard, the Robotics Supervisor credited for "realizing" the robots. John Badham named Eric "the most valuable player" on the film.

Most of the arm movements of Number 5 were controlled by a "telemetry suit", carried on the puppeteer's upper torso. Each joint in the suit had a separate sensor, allowing the puppeteer's arm and hand movements to be transferred directly to the machine. He was also voiced in real-time by his puppeteer, the director believing that it provided for more realistic interaction between the robot and the other actors than putting in his voice in post-production, although a few of his lines were re-dubbed later. 

During Stephanie's impromptu news interview, director John Badham makes a cameo appearance as the news cameraman.

The sequence in the film depicting Number 5 watching the movie Saturday Night Fever (and imitating John Travolta's dance moves) is an in-joke: Saturday Night Fever and Short Circuit were both directed by John Badham.

Fisher Stevens said that when he was originally hired to play Ben Jabituya, the character was not intended to be Indian. Stevens was fired and replaced by Bronson Pinchot at one point, but then Pinchot left to do the sitcom Perfect Strangers, and Stevens was rehired. To portray the role he had to grow a beard, dye his hair black, darken his skin with makeup, turn his blue eyes brown with contact lenses, speak with an East Indian accent and "walk hunched over like a cricket player". In 2015, Aziz Ansari had a cordial discussion with Stevens over the role, with Ansari saying he did not view Stevens as a bad guy or someone who played Ben as a tired stereotype, and Stevens saying (with Ansari's agreement) that a present-day version of the role would be played by an actor who had an Indian or a South Asian background.

In 2009, Austin Pendleton, who had gone to college with Short Circuit director John Badham, stated "some stuff was cut out of my part in [Short Circuit]. And also the two leading roles were cast with really talented, attractive people who were not right for the parts. [The] script was just 'heartbreakingly' beautiful to read. And now it's a nice little slightly bland kids' movie. Nothing exactly wrong with it. Those two people who are in the leads are good, very likable, easy-to-work-with people, and have done some good work; they just weren't those people that were written in the script. And I said to John when it was about to open, 'Why did you cast them?' And he said, 'That was what the studio insisted on'. And it sort of ended the discussion. I said, 'Okay'. The film kind of works, but again, it was going to have been quite a beautiful film".

According to Pendleton, the role Guttenberg ended up playing "...was a person who could not relate to other human beings, so he poured all that into the creation of the robot. Well, Steve, he's a lovely guy, and I think he's talented. I think he has a real sharp—especially in those days when they were hiring him all the time—he had a wonderful kind of charisma. Very easy, but utterly social. He's just so very engaging and open with people. He's wonderful to be on a movie with. He's just a real colleague. But he's just that way with people. He does not bring onscreen with him the problem that the character in that movie has. So you hear that he's shy and everything, but it's more like a convention than anything else. The perfect person for the role, 20 years earlier, would have been Dustin Hoffman. That thing that Dustin brought to The Graduate that a more affable actor would not have."

Guttenberg and Bailey had previously worked together on the Police Academy series of films.

Soundtrack
Although no soundtrack album was released at the time, El DeBarge had a chart hit with the single "Who's Johnny (Theme from Short Circuit)".

In 2008, Varèse Sarabande issued David Shire's score as part of their CD Club series of limited edition releases. The DeBarge song was not included or mentioned in the liner notes. The last three tracks are source music.

The booklet claims the end title song is not used in the film. It is, however, on the soundtrack. The finale mix and end title are combined into one track but used separately in the film.

Personnel
 Max Carl - vocals, keyboards (track 10)
 Marcy Levy - vocals (track 10)

Reception

Critical response
Short Circuit received mixed reviews from critics. On Rotten Tomatoes, it has a 61% rating from 38 reviews and an average rating of 5.30/10, with the website's consensus stating: "Amiable and good-natured but also shallow and predictable, Short Circuit is hardly as deep or emotionally resonant as E.T. – though Johnny Five makes for a charming robot protagonist". On Metacritic it has a score of 50 out of 100 based on reviews from 12 critics, indicating "mixed or average reviews". Audiences surveyed by CinemaScore gave it a grade A−.

Trade paper Variety wrote: "Short Circuit is a hip, sexless sci-fi send-up" and praised the writers "for some terrific dialog that would have been a lot less disarming if not for the winsome robot and Sheedy's affection for it. Guttenberg plays his best goofy self". Writing in The New York Times, Vincent Canby wrote: "The movie, which has the clean, well-scrubbed look of an old Disney comedy, is nicely acted". The Sun-Sentinel gave Short Circuit a good review, saying: "Number Five is the real star of this energetic film. Sheedy, Guttenberg and company are just supporting players". Roger Ebert, writing in the Chicago Sun-Times, rated Short Circuit 1.5 out of 4 four stars and called it "too cute for its own good".

Colin Greenland reviewed Short Circuit for issue 85 of White Dwarf and stated that "there are good jokes, but the picture's so bland they hardly count".

Box office
Short Circuit debuted at No. 1 in the US box office with a studio-reported weekend gross of $5.3 million, although independent sources suggested that the gross was inflated and more likely between $4.5 and $4.725 million. It grossed a domestic total of $40.7 million, ranking it 21st for 1986 in the United States; it performed slightly better than other hits of that year, such as Pretty in Pink, The Fly, Three Amigos, Little Shop Of Horrors and About Last Night. By 1987, Short Circuit had grossed  in worldwide theatrical and ancillary revenues (not including merchandise). The film was reportedly the top home video rental of 1987.

Accolades
 Honoured with the Winsor McCay Award [for career achievement]

Legacy

Video game

A video game developed by Ocean Software for ZX Spectrum, Commodore 64 and Amstrad CPC was also made based on the film. It featured two parts: one arcade adventure where Johnny 5 had to escape from the lab, and one action part where Johnny 5 escapes across the countryside, avoiding soldiers, other robots, and animals.

Sequel and remake

The sequel, Short Circuit 2, premiered on July 6, 1988. There was a script for a possible third film written in 1989 and rewritten in 1990 but was found unsatisfactory by the producers, and the project was subsequently scrapped.

Johnny 5 answered questions in character in a videotaped interview with Dallas-based reporter Bobbie Wygant to promote Short Circuit 2. He would later appear in an episode of Home, voiced by Peter Greenwood, and in a short educational film, Hot Cars, Cold Facts, voiced by Russell Turner.

On April 4, 2008, Variety reported that Dimension Films had acquired the rights to remake the original film. Dan Milano had been hired to write the script, and David Foster to produce it. Foster said that the robot's appearance would not change. Later in October 2009, the reports circulated that Steve Carr will direct the remake and that the film's plot would involve a boy from a broken family befriending the Number 5 robot. Carr left the project and on August 4, 2011 Tim Hill was reportedly hired to direct.

Spyglass Media Group bought the rights on November 15, 2020, and was reportedly planning to make a remake with James Vanderbilt through his company Project X Productions, Paul Neinstein and William Sherak producing, Eduardo Cisneros and Jason Shuman writing, and John W. Hyde returning as executive producer alongside Terissa Kelton. The company plans to put a Latino twist on the original screenplay.

Accusations of whitewashing 
American comedian Aziz Ansari cited the casting of Fisher Stevens, a white actor, to play Indian character Ben Jabituya in "brownface" as an example of whitewashing in Hollywood. In 2021, Stevens said: "It definitely haunts me. I still think it's a really good movie, but I would never do that part again. The world was a different place in 1986, obviously". 

According to Badham, the character was planned to be American when Stevens was cast; inspired by a scene in Beverly Hills Cop (1984) in which a French shop assistant is rude to her American customers, Badham made Ben Indian, thinking the "culture mismatch was fun". He said he would have auditioned Indian or Indian-American actors had the decision been made before Stevens was cast. He said: "That was an oversight on our part, but we never intended to make fun of the character of Ben".

References

External links

 
 
 
 

1986 films
1980s science fiction comedy films
American science fiction comedy films
American robot films
Cold War in popular culture
Cultural depictions of The Three Stooges
1980s English-language films
Films about artificial intelligence
Films about technological impact
Films directed by John Badham
Puppet films
Films set in Astoria, Oregon
Films shot in Astoria, Oregon
Films shot in Portland, Oregon
Films set in Portland, Oregon
Films shot in Oregon
Films set in Oregon
Military science fiction films
TriStar Pictures films
Films scored by David Shire
1986 comedy films
1980s American films